Nicolas "Nic" Rasmussen  (born 1962) is a historian of modern life sciences, and a professor in the School of Humanities and Languages at the University of New South Wales.

With major interests in the history of amphetamines, the history of drug abuse, and the history of clinical trials, he has higher degrees in history and philosophy of science, developmental biology, and public health.

Early life 
Born in Paris in 1962 of American parents – computer scientist Norman L. Rasmussen (1928—2003), later director of IBM's Cambridge Scientific Center, and an important contributor to the development of time-sharing operating systems, and Laura Sootin Rasmussen (1933—), later an organiser and officer of the National Organization for Women in New England – he attended the Roxbury Latin School, near Boston, in Massachusetts.

Education 
Having worked in biology research labs since his early teens, Rasmussen's undergraduate exposure to art history and theory spurred an interest in history and philosophy of science; and, as a consequence, he enrolled in a PhD program in Philosophy at the University of Chicago to pursue this field.  He worked there with William Wimsatt for two years; and, after taking a master's degree, he went on to Cambridge University to study history of biology with Nick Jardine in the M.Phil. program in History and Philosophy of Science.

Then, in 1987 he took up a PhD scholarship in Biological Sciences at Stanford University; and, while pursuing doctoral research in plant developmental biology under Paul B. Green, he also continued working in history of science with Tim Lenoir.

In 2007, to allow him to become more involved in health policy scholarship, he took a master's degree in Public Health at University of Sydney Medical School.

Career 
After postdoctoral training in history of science at Stanford and Harvard – and short term teaching positions in the field at Princeton and UCLA – he moved to a teaching position in history and philosophy of science at Sydney University (1994—1997) and, then, to the University of New South Wales in Sydney, where he is now a Professor.

In 2019 he was elected a fellow of the Australian Academy of the Humanities.

Research 
His research has dealt with the role of instrumentation in shaping scientific knowledge; the history of biotechnology, molecular biology and its cultural and intellectual history; the history of drug abuse and pharmaceuticals in the United States since 1900; and the influence of industry sponsorship on biomedical research.

He is best known for his focus on the ways in which experimental methods and technology can shape research disciplines, sociologically and intellectually, and on the related role of patronage in shaping scientific fields in the mid-20th century USA. He has been principal investigator on several National Science Foundation (US) and Australian Research Council grants.

Works 
His first book, Picture Control: The Electron Microscope and the Transformation of Biology in America, 1940–1960 (1998), won both the Paul Bunge Prize for 1999, and the Forum for the History of Science in America's Book Prize for 2000.

His second book, On Speed: The Many Lives of Amphetamine (2008), is a widely cited history of the amphetamines in medicine and American culture.

His third book, Gene Jockeys: Life Science and the Rise of Biotech Enterprise (2014), was shortlisted in the "basis of medicine category" of the 2015 British Medical Association's Medical Book Awards, and was highly commended by the judging panel.

Footnotes

References 

 Cohen, P. and Rasmussen, N. (2013), "A Nation of Kids on Speed: Six million children in the U.S. have already been diagnosed with ADHD. Plenty more will follow", The Wall Street Journal, (16 June 2013).
 Parr, J. and Rasmussen, N. (2012), "Making Addicts of the Fat: Obesity, Psychiatry and the ‘Fatties Anonymous’ Model of Self-Help Weight Loss in the Post-War United States", pp. 181–200 in Netherland, J. (ed.), Critical Perspectives on Addiction (Advances in Medical Sociology, Volume 14), Emerald Group Publishing Limited, (Bingley), 2012. doi=10.1108/S1057-6290(2012)0000014012
 Rasmussen, N. (1997), The Mid-Century Biophysics Bubble: Hiroshima and the Biological Revolution in America, Revisited", History of Science, Vol.35, No.3, (September 1997), pp.245–293.
 Rasmussen, N. (1998), Picture Control: The Electron Microscope and the Transformation of Biology in America, 1940–1960, Stanford University Press, (Stanford, CA), 1998. 
 Rasmussen, N. (2001), "Plant Hormones in War and Peace: Science, Industry, and Government in the Development of Herbicides in 1940s America", Isis, Vol.92, No.2 (June 2001), pp.291–316.
 Rasmussen, N. (2002), "Steroids in Arms: Science, Government, Industry, and the Hormones of the Adrenal Cortex in the United States, 1930–1950", Medical History, Vol.46, No.3, (July 2002), pp.299–234.
 Rasmussen, N. (2004), "The Moral Economy of the Drug Company-Medical Scientist Collaboration in Interwar America", Social Studies of Science, Vol.34, No.2, (April 2004), pp. 161–185. doi=10.1177/0306312704042623
 Rasmussen, N. (2005), "The Drug Industry and Clinical Research in Interwar America: Three Types of Physician Collaborator", Bulletin of the History of Medicine, Vol.79, No.1, (Spring 2005), pp. 50–80.
 Rasmussen, N. (2006), "Making The First Anti-Depressant: Amphetamine In American Medicine, 1929—1950: A Quantitative and Qualitative Retrospective With Implications for the Present", Journal of the History of Medicine and Allied Sciences, Vol.61, No.3, (July 2006), pp.288–323.
 Rasmussen, N. (2008), On Speed: The Many Lives of Amphetamine, New York University Press, (New York, NY), 2008. 
 Rasmussen, N. (2008), "America's First Amphetamine Epidemic 1929–1971: A Quantitative and Qualitative Retrospective with Implications for the Present", American Journal of Public Health, Vol.98, No.6, (June 2008), pp.974–985.
 Rasmussen, N. (2011), "Medical Science and the Military: The Allies' use of Amphetamine during World War II", Journal of Interdisciplinary History, Vol.42, No.2, (Autumn 2011), pp. 205–233. doi=10.1162/JINH_a_00212
 Rasmussen, N. (2102), "Weight Stigma, Addiction, Science, and the Medication of Fatness in Mid-Twentieth Century America", Sociology of Health & Illness, Vol.34, No.6, (July 2012), pp. 880–895. doi=10.1111/j.1467-9566.2011.01444.x
 Rasmussen, N. (2013), "On Slicing an Obvious Salami Thinly: Science, Patent Case Law, and the Fate of the Early Biotech Sector in the Making of EPO", Perspectives in Biology and Medicine, Vol.56, No.2, (Spring 2013), pp. 198–222 doi=10.1353/pbm.2013.0016
 Rasmussen, N. (2013), "Looking back on the chequered past of drug trials", The Conversation, (7 October 2013).
 Rasmussen, N. (2014), Gene Jockeys: Life Science and the Rise of Biotech Enterprise, Johns Hopkins University Press (Baltimore, MD), 2014. 
 Rasmussen, N. (2015), "Stigma and the Addiction Paradigm for Obesity: Lessons from 1950s America", Addiction, Vol.110, No.2, (February 2015), pp. 217–225. doi=10.1111/add.12774
 Rasmussen, N. (2015), "Amphetamine-Type Stimulants: The Early History of Their Medical and Non-Medical Uses", International Review of Neurobiology, Vol.120, (2015), pp. 9–25. doi=10.1016/bs.irn.2015.02.001
 Rasmussen, N., Lee, K., and Bero, L. (2009), "Association of Trial Registration with the Results and Conclusions of Published Trials of New Oncology Drugs", Trials, (16 December 2009).

1962 births
Historians of science
Australian medical historians
Historians of technology
University of Chicago alumni
Alumni of the University of Cambridge
Stanford University alumni
University of Sydney alumni
Academic staff of the University of New South Wales
Naturalised citizens of Australia
Living people
Roxbury Latin School alumni
Fellows of the Australian Academy of the Humanities